The Archbishop's Palace, known prior to 1944 as the Bishop's Palace, is a palatial building in Mdina, Malta which is a residence of the Roman Catholic Archbishop of Malta. It was constructed in the early 18th century, and it is located close to St Paul's Cathedral and the Mdina Cathedral Museum.

History 
A Bishop's residence existed in Mdina in 1445, and amongst other functions it housed the diocese's archives (Archivum Archiepiscopalis Melitensis, AAM). The residence and administrative seat moved from Mdina to a second Bishop's Palace in the capital city of Valletta in the mid-1630s.

The present building was constructed between 1718 and 1720 according to the designs of architect Lorenzo Gafà, shortly after the reconstruction of the adjacent St Paul's Cathedral.

On 10 June 1798, during the French invasion of Malta, the palace hosted a council meeting during which city officials decided to surrender Mdina to the French without a fight. The capitulation document was signed within the palace, and on the same day French general Claude-Henri Belgrand de Vaubois and his staff were invited to dine with Bishop Vincenzo Labini.

Architecture 
The palace is built within a restricted site in Archbishop's Square directly adjacent to the Cathedral and the city's fortifications. Its exterior gives an impression of importance and elegance despite being dominated by the cathedral, and the ground floor consists of small, undecorated rooms while the upper floor is more imposing.

See also 
 Bishop's Palace, Birgu
 Archbishop's Palace, Valletta

Notes

References

External links 
 

Buildings and structures completed in 1720
Episcopal palaces of the Catholic Church
Limestone buildings in Malta
Mdina